When Father Was Away on Business is a 1985 Yugoslav film by Serbian director Emir Kusturica. The screenplay was written by the Bosnian dramatist Abdulah Sidran. Its subtitle is A Historical Love Film and it was produced by Centar Film and Forum, production companies based in Sarajevo.

Set in post-World War II Yugoslavia during the Informbiro period, the film tells the story from the perspective of a boy, Malik, whose father Meša (Miki Manojlović) was sent to a labour camp. When Father Was Away on Business won the Palme d'Or at the 1985 Cannes Film Festival and was nominated for the Academy Award for Best Foreign Language Film.

Plot
In June 1950, a local neighbourhood drunk Čika Franjo serenades field workers. He sings Mexican songs, out of self-preservation, figuring it's safer for him to steer clear of songs originating from either of the two dominant global superpowers — the United States and Soviet Union — in the current climate of Cold War. Yugoslavia is experiencing a paranoid repressive internal apparatus looking to identify and remove enemies of the state in the wake of the Tito–Stalin Split. The local children, including Malik, climb trees and play around. Malik's mother Sena tells him that his father is on a business trip, while Malik is a chronic sleepwalker. His father, communist functionary Meša, was in fact sent to a labour camp by his own brother-in-law, Sena's brother Zijo, who's an even higher positioned Communist functionary. Meša had made a remark about a political cartoon regarding the Tito–Stalin Split in the Politika newspaper.

After a while, Meša's wife and children rejoin him in Zvornik. Malik meets Maša, the daughter of a Russian doctor. He falls in love with her, but last sees her when the ambulance takes her away.

At the wedding of his maternal uncle Fahro, Malik witnesses his father's affair with a woman pilot. She later tries to commit suicide by using a toilet's flush cord. Sena reconciles with her brother Zijah, who's been diagnosed with diabetes.

Cast

Reception
The writer Danilo Kiš described the film as "an artistic and moral endeavour."

In The New York Times, Janet Maslin credited the film for " a humorous, richly detailed portrait" of its characters. Time critic Richard Corliss said the film was worth seeing despite the lack of glamorous settings or characters.  Variety staff called it "rather witty commentary" and compared it to Czechoslovak comedy films in the 1960s. John Simon of the National Review described When Father Was Away on Business as "a film of undaunted honesty and unswerving intelligence, borne out aloft by humor, heartache, satire and compassion-an unbeatable combination".

In his 2015 Movie Guide, Leonard Maltin awarded it three and a half stars, praising it as "Captivating". In 2016, The Hollywood Reporter ranked it the 26th best film to win the Palme d'Or, citing it for depicting how "humor and the almost mystical power of family trumps all."

The Japanese filmmaker Akira Kurosawa cited this movie as one of his 100 favorite films.

Accolades
When Father Was Away on Business marked Emir Kusturica's first time winning the Palme d'Or, the highest honour at the Cannes Film Festival. He won his second in 1995 for Underground.

See also
 List of Yugoslavian films
 List of submissions to the 58th Academy Awards for Best Foreign Language Film
 List of Yugoslav submissions for the Academy Award for Best Foreign Language Film

References

External links
 
 
 

1985 films
1985 comedy-drama films
1980s coming-of-age comedy-drama films
1980s political comedy-drama films
Films directed by Emir Kusturica
Films set in 1950
Films set in Bosnia and Herzegovina
Films set in Sarajevo
Films set in Yugoslavia
Golan-Globus films
Palme d'Or winners
Serbo-Croatian-language films
Yugoslav comedy-drama films
Yugoslav coming-of-age films